Michael Oldfield may refer to:

Michael Oldfield (rugby league), Australian rugby league footballer
Mike Oldfield, English musician